The wiki rabbit hole is the learning pathway which a reader travels by navigating from topic to topic while browsing Wikipedia and other wikis. Other names for the concept include wiki black hole and wikihole. The metaphor of a hole comes from Lewis Carroll's 1865 novel Alice's Adventures in Wonderland, in which Alice begins an adventure by following the White Rabbit into his burrow.

When watching videos outside of Wikipedia, many people go to Wikipedia to get more information about what they watched and proceed into the wiki rabbit hole to topics progressively further removed from where they started.  Films based on historical people or events often spur viewers to explore Wikipedia rabbit holes.

Data visualizations showing the relationships between Wikipedia articles demonstrate pathways that readers can take to navigate from topic to topic.

The Wikimedia Foundation publishes research on how readers enter rabbit holes. Rabbit hole browsing behavior happens in various languages of Wikipedias.

Wikipedia users have shared their rabbit hole experiences as part of Wikipedia celebrations as well as on social media. Some people go to Wikipedia for the fun of seeking a rabbit hole. Exploring the rabbit hole can be part of wikiracing.

The satirical The Onion wrote in 2021 that Wikipedia co-founder Jimmy Wales had been in a Wikipedia rabbit hole since 2001, but would now move on to other things, "as soon as he looked up one more thing".

References

External links
The Problem with Wikipedia, an xkcd comic on the wiki rabbit hole
Wiki Wormhole, Wikipedia article review series from The A.V. Club

Wikipedia
Metaphors referring to animals